Vietnam is the third studio album by Shockabilly, released in 1984 by Fundamental Records. It released on CD as Vietnam/Heaven in 1990.

Track listing

Personnel
Adapted from the Vietnam liner notes.

Shockabilly
 Eugene Chadbourne – vocals, electric guitar
 Kramer – vocals, bass guitar, tape, production
 David Licht – drums

Production and additional personnel
 Juan Maciel – recording
 Michael Macioce – cover art
 Tom Mark – recording
 Ed Sanders – vocals (B5)

Release history

References

External links 
 

1984 albums
Shockabilly albums
Albums produced by Kramer (musician)